Vladimir Danich (7 May 1886 – 18 March 1970) was a Russian Empire fencer. He competed in the individual and team sabre events at the 1912 Summer Olympics.

References

1886 births
1970 deaths
Male fencers from the Russian Empire
Olympic competitors for the Russian Empire
Fencers at the 1912 Summer Olympics